The 1988 Wake Forest Demon Deacons football team was an American football team that represented Wake Forest University during the 1988 NCAA Division I-A football season. In its second season under head coach Bill Dooley, the team compiled a 6–4–1 record and finished in a tie for fourth place in the Atlantic Coast Conference.

Schedule

Roster

Team leaders

Team players in the NFL

References

Wake Forest
Wake Forest Demon Deacons football seasons
Wake Forest Demon Deacons football